Ageratella is a genus of flowering plants in the family Asteraceae.

Species include:
Ageratella microphylla (Sch.Bip.) A.Gray ex S.Watson
Ageratella palmeri (A.Gray) B.L.Rob.

References

Eupatorieae
Taxa named by Sereno Watson
Asteraceae genera